Lee Thompson may refer to:

 Lee Thompson (baseball) (1898–1963), Major League Baseball pitcher
 Lee Thompson (footballer) (born 1982), midfielder for Kidderminster Harriers F.C.
 Lee Thompson (politician), former Florida Commissioner of Agriculture
 Lee Thompson (saxophonist) (born 1957), saxophonist of the ska/pop band Madness
 Lee Thompson (sprinter) (born 1997), English sprinter
 Lee A. Thompson, American psychologist
 J. Lee Thompson (1914–2002), British film director
 Lee Thompson (EastEnders), fictional character